The Magic Carpet Bus system serves the Town of Enfield, Connecticut. The service began in January 2013 and operates on two routes, the Blue Line and the Yellow Line. Blue Line service typically begins at 7 AM and ends at 11 PM and Yellow Line service typically begins at 7:30 AM and ends at 6:30 PM, Monday through Friday. The Blue Line also operates 7 AM to 9 PM on Saturday.

Enfield Transit also operates ADA Paratransit within 3/4 miles of a fixed route for persons who cannot use the fixed-route service due to a disability.

References

Bus transportation in Connecticut
Transportation in Hartford County, Connecticut
Enfield, Connecticut